Mario Conde. Los días de gloria is a two-part Spanish television miniseries. It is an adaptation of the Mario Conde's memoir Los días de gloria, portraying the 1993 intervention of Banesto. Directed by Salvador Calvo and starring Daniel Grao in the leading role, it aired in 2013 on Telecinco.

Premise 
The plot accounts for the Mario Conde's meteoric rise together with his friend Juan Abelló in the banking system, that ended up with the 1993 intervention of Banesto (chaired by Conde) by the Bank of Spain and a 20-year prison sentence eventually handed to Conde.

Cast 
 Daniel Grao as Mario Conde.
 Mariona Ribas as Lourdes Arroyo.
 Juan Carlos Vellido as Arturo Romaní.
 Francesc Orella as Juan Abelló.
 Pedro Casablanc as Mariano Rubio, the Governor of the Bank of Spain.
 Manolo Solo as Carlos Solchaga.
 Enrique Arce as Fernando Garro.
 Úrsula Corberó as Paloma Aliende.
 Mikel Tello as César Mora.
 Berta Gómez as Ana Gamazo.
 José Luis Patiño as Narcís Serra.
  as Miguel Martín.
 Manuel Regueiro as Alberto Cortina.
 Jesús Noguero as Alberto Alcocer.
 Ángel Hidalgo as King Juan Carlos.
 Manuel de Blas as Don Juan de Borbón.
 José Chaves as Felipe González.
 Jaime G. Arija as José María Aznar.

Production and release 
Produced by Mediaset España in collaboration with DLO Producciones, the miniseries was an adaptation of the memoir book Los días de gloria by Mario Conde, who was reportedly initially satisfied with the result and even lended part of his personal clothing. The screenplay was authored by Helena Medina, whereas the two parts were directed by Salvador Calvo. Despite his early positive views on the series, Conde harshly criticised the removal of a scene concerning a conversation with the King, which was left unaired.

References 

Spanish television miniseries
Television shows set in Madrid
Television shows filmed in Spain
2010s Spanish drama television series
Political thriller television series
2013 Spanish television series debuts
2013 Spanish television series endings
Telecinco network series
Television series set in 1993
Spanish thriller television series
Spanish biographical television series
Television series by DLO Producciones